Haathon Ki Lakeeren (Lines On the Palm) is a 1986 Indian Bollywood film produced and directed by Chetan Anand. It stars Sanjeev Kumar, Zeenat Aman, Jackie Shroff Yashodhan Pandit 
and Priya Rajvansh in pivotal roles.

Cast
 Sanjeev Kumar as Dr. Bhanupratap
 Jackie Shroff as Lalit Mohan Singh
 Zeenat Aman as Geeta Singh
 Priya Rajvansh as Mala R. Singh Yadav
 Sudhir Dalvi as Singing Fakeer
 Bharat Kapoor as Lalit's Lawyer
 Shubha Khote as Leela
 Dina Pathak as Geeta's Mother

Soundtrack

External links

1980s Hindi-language films
1986 films
Films directed by Chetan Anand